Drew "Mongo" Parsons (born October 12, 1974 in West Chester, Pennsylvania) is the bassist for the band American Hi-Fi.

Early life
Drew Parsons moved to the Boston area in 1993 to attend Boston College. In 1994, he began a professional music career playing with local Boston artist, Tracy Bonham.  He toured the world with Tracy Bonham, and made a Gold selling record, “The Burdens of Being Upright”, which received a Grammy nomination.  In 1997, Drew started his own band, American Hi-Fi, with 3 other local Boston musicians. They have made 4 records, and toured the United States, Europe, and Japan for over 9 years. They have appeared on MTV, the Late Show with David Letterman, The Tonight Show, and several other International programs, including Top of the Pops in England. Their music has appeared in many films and TV shows, and they continue to make music today.

Personal life

Drew is married to Esti Parsons.  Along with Christopher Myers and Michael Scholow, they opened Radius, a top restaurant in Boston. The couple later opened other Boston restaurants with business partner Jon Parsons (Drew's brother), including Sam's and The Maiden.

References

1974 births
Living people
People from West Chester, Pennsylvania
Guitarists from Philadelphia
American male bass guitarists
American Hi-Fi members
21st-century American bass guitarists
21st-century American male musicians